This is a list of notable footballers who have played for Northampton Town. The aim is for this list to include all players that have played 100 or more senior matches for the club. Other players who are deemed to have played an important role for the club can be included, but the reason for their notability should be included in the 'Notes' column.

For a list of all Northampton Town players with a Wikipedia article, see :Category:Northampton Town F.C. players. For the current Northampton Town first-team squad, see the Players section of the club's main article.

Players are listed according to the year of their first team debut for the club, and then by order of surname. Wartime matches are excluded.

Notable players
Statistics correct as of 18 March 2023.

(n/a) = Information not available
Players in bold are still playing for the club.

Notes

References
 
 Soccerbase stats (use Search for...on left menu and select 'Players' drop down)
Books

 
Players
Northampton Town
Association football player non-biographical articles